Ken Danby,  D.F.A. (6 March 1940 – 23 September 2007) was a Canadian painter. Danby is best known for creating highly realistic paintings that study everyday life.  His 1972 painting  At the Crease, portraying a masked hockey goalie defending his net, is widely recognized and reproduced in Canada.

Early life and education
Danby was born and grew up in Sault Ste. Marie, Ontario. He began drawing and painting in high school. He enrolled at the Ontario College of Art in 1958.

Career
Early in his career, Danby experimented with abstract expressionism.
In August 1961, Danby participated in the first Toronto Outdoor Art Exhibition (TOAE) in the parking lot of the Four Seasons hotel, located at that time on Jarvis Street in Toronto. Danby won the "Best of Exhibition" prize with an untitled abstract, currently in the collection of the artist.

Danby later focused on realism in most of his work, and developed his skill with watercolour.  His first solo exhibition in 1964 sold out.

In 1975, Danby was elected a member of the Royal Canadian Academy of Arts. He designed four coins for the 1976 Montreal Olympics.

He also received the Jessie Dow Prize, the 125th Anniversary Commemorative Medal of Canada, the City of Sault Ste. Marie's Award of Merit and both the Queen's Silver and Golden Jubilee Medals.

In the 1980s, Danby painted a number of watercolours about the America's Cup and portrayed Canadian athletes at the 1984 Winter Olympics in Sarajevo. Danby has served on the governing board of the Canada Council and as a member of the Board of Trustees of the National Gallery of Canada.

In 1997, Danby received an Honorary Doctorate of Fine Arts from Laurentian University in Sudbury, Ontario.

In 1999 Danby had a studio near Guelph. In 2001, he was vested in both the Order of Ontario and the Order of Canada.

A school on Grange Road in Guelph, Ontario was named after Danby. Ken Danby Way in his home town of the Sault Ste. Marie includes the Public Library and fittingly, the Art Gallery of Algoma. He was inducted into the Sault's Walk of Fame in 2006.

In 2016, the Art Gallery of Hamilton organized a retrospective of Danby's work, entitled Beyond the Crease.

For approximately three decades until his death, Danby lived and painted in a rural property near Guelph, Ontario, and spent years restoring the historic Armstrong Mill; some of his art work features the property. From November 2016 to January 2017, the Guelph Civic Museum exhibited examples of Danby's work including his Wayne Gretzky portrait, The Great Farewell.

Death 
On 23 September 2007, Danby collapsed while on a canoe trip in Algonquin Park near North Tea Lake with his wife Gillian Danby and friends. The party summoned help, but paramedics were unable to revive him.

Danby is the second famous Canadian artist to die in Algonquin Park. Tom Thomson died on Canoe Lake at the park in July 1917. Canadian writer Blair Frazer also drowned in the park on the Petawawa River's Rollaway Rapids in May 1968.

Family 
The subject matter of many of Danby's early works was found on St. Joseph Island and it was there that he met his first wife Judy Harcourt, whom he married in 1965. Together they purchased a home at Armstrong Mill near Guelph, Ontario, which provided Danby with subject matter from which to gain inspiration. The couple had three sons, who have appeared in Danby's work. They separated in 1980 and divorced in 1984. One of his sons from this marriage is Noah Danby, an actor. Danby's second wife's was Gillian Rumble, to whom he was married until his death.

References

External links
 Official site
 Order of Canada Citation
 Kenneth Edison Danby at The Canadian Encyclopedia

1940 births
2007 deaths
20th-century Canadian painters
Canadian male painters
21st-century Canadian painters
Artists from Ontario
Canadian people of English descent
Members of the Order of Canada
Members of the Order of Ontario
People from Sault Ste. Marie, Ontario
Members of the Royal Canadian Academy of Arts
20th-century Canadian male artists
21st-century Canadian male artists